is a passenger railway station  located in the city of Tottori, Tottori Prefecture, Japan. It is operated by the West Japan Railway Company (JR West).

Lines

Station layout
The station consists of one ground-level side platform and one island platform connected by a  footbridge to the station building.  The station is unattended.

Platforms

History
Aoya Station opened on May 15, 1905. With the privatization of the Japan National Railways (JNR) on April 1, 1987, the station came under the aegis of the West Japan Railway Company.

Passenger statistics
In fiscal 2020, the station was used by an average of 389 passengers daily.

Surrounding area
Tottori City Hall Aoya Town General Branch (former Aoya Town Office)
Tottori Prefectural Aoya High School
Tottori City Aoya Junior High School
Tottori City Aoya Elementary School

See also
List of railway stations in Japan

References

External links 

 Aoya Station from JR-Odekake.net 

Railway stations in Tottori Prefecture
Stations of West Japan Railway Company
Sanin Main Line
Railway stations in Japan opened in 1905
Tottori (city)